FC Reformatsiya Abakan was a Russian football team from Abakan. It played professionally in the Russian Second Division in 1999 and 2000, taking 11th spot in the East Zone in 1999 and dropping out of the competition after playing 10 games in 2000.

External links
  Team history by footballfacts

Association football clubs established in 1993
Association football clubs disestablished in 2000
Defunct football clubs in Russia
Sport in Khakassia
1993 establishments in Russia
2000 disestablishments in Russia
Abakan